Dan Donnelly is a Northern Irish singer-songwriter and, as of 2022, a member of the Levellers.

Career 
Growing up in Belfast, Donnelly played in a number of local bands, finding success in Ireland with Watercress, a four-piece acoustic folk-rock band for whom he played guitar, mandolin, percussion and "plumbing" (a home-made didgeridoo). They released six EPs between 1995 and 1998, when they released their one album, Bummer, all on their own local label, Creeping Herb. The Donnelly-penned Candlemaker reached the No.1 position on the Irish Indie Chart.  Watercress played their final concert at the Empire Music Hall in Belfast on 23 December 2000 and disbanded in early 2001.

After Watercress disbanded, Donnelly moved to New York to pursue a solo career. Whilst there he released two studio albums, Bootleg (2005), and Yearning a Living (2007), which received extensive airtime on BBC Radio, as well as one live album Live in NYC (2008). Donnelly was backed on all three albums by his supporting band Sonovagun (Sean Barry, Graham Finn, Ray Burns and Roy Harter). Donnelly also played as a session musician for several artists, including Joy Zipper. 

In 2009, Donnelly returned to the UK to live, setting in Exeter, Devon. In mid-2010 he signed with record label IRL (Independent Records Ltd). In October 2010, he released the single Running, followed by the album Country & Northern in May 2011. Around the same time, Donnelly recorded a cover of Paradise City by Guns N' Roses which featured in a television advert for Anchor Butter. He then relocated to Middlesbrough in the North East of England.

Donnelly has toured with both solo shows and in support of artists such as The Levellers, Damien Dempsey, and Duke Special. He has also performed as part of the live bands of The Levellers, Oysterband and Joy Zipper. His own recording and touring live band, Sonovagun, has included Ali McMordie of Stiff Little Fingers on bass guitar and television composer Roy Harter on keyboards and theremin.

Donnelly has performed on the UK summer festival circuit, including at Glastonbury Festival's Leftfield stage, Beautiful Days festival, The Big Session, and various festivals throughout Europe.

In May 2014, Donnelly was announced as the newest member of the alternative rock band The Wonder Stuff, co-writing their top 40 album 30 Goes Around the Sun.

In 2018, Donnelly became the lead singer and guitarist for French super group The Celtic Social Club.
After a number of European festival performances, they released the album From Babylon to Avalon, co-written by Donnelly, in 2019.

Donnelly's fifth studio album entitled, Are We Having Fun? was released in November 2018 on On the Fiddle Records. The album was preceded by the singles Time of Our Lives and I Don't Care.

In 2020, Donnelly collaborated with Goulven Hamel and Anth Mills to form a new project The Wooden Faces. They released the album / audio experiment, Flying the Wrong Way in May 2020.

Donnelly completed a masters in music in 2019. He currently manages The Peacock, a music venue, pub and kitchen in Sunderland with his business partner Barry Hyde of The Futureheads. The pair previously managed The Academy of Music and Sound in Gateshead, Tyne and Wear. He is also a member of the Stockton on Tees based male voice choir, Infant Hercules.

In 2022, the Levellers announced that Donnelly was joining as a full-time member., which coincided with his departure from Celtic Social Club.

Discography

Solo
 Running E.P. (2010)
 Country & Northern (2011)
 Are We Having Fun? (2018)

With Watercress
 Candlemaker E.P. (1996) No.1 Irish Indie Chart
 Tripped Up E.P. (1996)
 Bummer (1998)
 Oh Yeah E.P. (2000)

With Sonovagun
 Bootleg (2005)
 The Beach E.P. (2006)
 Yearning a Living (2007)
 Live in NYC (2008)

With The Wonderstuff
 30 Goes Around the Sun (March 2016) No. 38 UK Album Chart

With The Celtic Social Club
 From Babylon To Avalon (2019)
 Dancing or dying ? (2021)

With The Wooden Faces
 Flying The Wrong Way (2020)

References

External links 
 Website of The Celtic Social Club
 Dan Donnelly on Facebook

Songwriters from Northern Ireland
Musicians from Belfast
Irish  male singer-songwriters
1974 births
Living people
The Wonder Stuff members
21st-century male singers from Northern Ireland